"Amends" is episode ten of season three of the television show Buffy the Vampire Slayer. It was written and directed by series creator Joss Whedon. Advertised as a Christmas episode, it was first broadcast on December 15, 1998.

Plot
It is Christmas in Sunnydale and Angel is haunted with dreams of the people he murdered over the years as Angelus. Visions of his past victims, including Jenny Calendar, appear to him. When Buffy starts getting dragged into his memory-nightmares, experiencing Angel's dreams also, they realize something unnatural is happening. Angel's visions develop and try to get him to kill Buffy, saying that he will be released from the pain if he does so. Angel cannot bring himself to do this, so instead he opts to kill himself by standing on a hill and waiting for the sun to come up.

Buffy and Giles figure out that the First Evil has been driving Angel insane. Buffy finds the Bringers and pummels them. After the First appears to her, informing her that she cannot possibly fight it, and that Angel is about to be destroyed by the dawn's light, she runs to his mansion to stop him. Buffy, who invited and ordered Faith to watch Joyce, finds Angel atop the hill behind the mansion, awaiting sunrise. However, the heatwave from which Sunnydale has been suffering abruptly ends and the first flakes of snow start to fall, which Angel takes as a sign he was brought back for a purpose. With the weather report saying the sun should not be expected to be seen at all that day, Buffy and Angel take a walk through the town.

Meanwhile, Oz tells Willow that he is willing to give their relationship another chance while Cordelia is not as forgiving and resumes her previously hostile ways towards the Scooby gang. Oz goes to Willow's house to watch videos only to find her dressed up and playing Barry White's music, intending to sleep with him. Oz appreciates the gesture, but explains to Willow that he wants their first time to be special rather than just a way for her to try to make things up to him.

Interpretation

Humans’ sinful nature 
According to Susannah Clements the episode "provides a rich perceptive exploration of humanity's sinful nature. Humans are not only "not strong enough to fight evil in general", but are also not able to "fight their own sinful nature". The good that can be done is not enough and it can not be done all the time. The First Evil sends Angel back from hell to kill Buffy. As Angel has a soul he is struggling with his evil nature. The First Evil is something that Buffy isn't able to fight off or kill. Angel is convinced by the First Evil, that he has to either kill Buffy or himself. There is no way for humans to fight this purest form of evil. Angel realizes that, even though Buffy tries to save him. She tells him that there is a weakness in everyone, but everyone has "the power to do real good" and to "make amends". Angel replies, that it is not the demon in him that needs to be killed, but the man. The evil is too strong and it can not be fought alone. So within the series "salvation comes without of humanity", the sun in which Angel tries to kill himself, can not be seen for the whole day. Angel is saved.

The Snow 
When Angel tried to kill himself awaiting the sunrise, it suddenly snows and the sun can not be seen there. When Joss Whedon was asked if it was God who made it snow, he answered that he is an atheist, but that he can also not ignore "the idea of a Christmas miracle". He says that the Christian mythology is fascinating for him and also finds its way into his stories. Redemption, hope, and purpose are important to him. He doesn't mind "a strictly Christian interpretation being placed on this episode" by everyone believing in it. He just hopes it is not limited to it.

Reception
A reviewer for the BBC praised the writing, acting, and directing of Buffy's rescue of Angel, but criticized the ending where the sunrise is hidden by falling snow.

References

External links

 
 Where Do We Go from Here? A farewell to "Buffy the Vampire Slayer" and a look back at the show's ten best episodes

Buffy the Vampire Slayer (season 3) episodes
American Christmas television episodes
1998 American television episodes
Television episodes written by Joss Whedon
Works about atonement
Television episodes directed by Joss Whedon
Television episodes about nightmares
Television episodes set in Ireland
Television episodes about personifications of death